is a retired Japanese actress. She is from Toyonaka, Osaka Pref., Japan. Her real name is Toshiko Ishihara, or Toshiko Ozaki in her spinsterhood. 
In 1969, she won the Elan d'Or Prize. She was active in the various movies, i.e. Kaze no Bojo, and in 1973 she got married with the cinema director Shigeru Ishihara, so that she retired as an actress.

External links 
 
 Nana Ozaki  - Introduction with photos

1948 births
Living people
Japanese actresses
People from Toyonaka, Osaka